Pompeio Arrigoni or Pompeo Arrigoni (1552–1616) was a Roman Catholic cardinal.

Biography
On 24 Feb 1607, he was consecrated bishop Pope Paul V, with Ludovico de Torres, Archbishop of Monreale, with Marcello Lante della Rovere, Bishop of Todi, serving as co-consecrators.

While bishop, he was the principal consecrator of Bartolomeo Giorgi, Bishop of Pesaro (1609); and Pietro Federici, Bishop of Vulturara e Montecorvino (1609).

References

1552 births
1616 deaths
17th-century Italian cardinals
17th-century Italian Roman Catholic archbishops